The 2015 Tour Femenino de San Luis was the second edition of the Tour Femenino de San Luis, a stage race held in the San Luis province in Argentina. A 2.2-rated, UCI-sanctioned event, the race was held between 11 and 16 January. It was the first race of the 2015 Women's Elite cycling calendar and mirrored the men's cycling event, the Tour de San Luis. The race was won by Janildes Fernandes, riding for a Brazilian national team.

Teams
Source:

UCI Women's Teams

Club teams

Acimproba–Orbai
Argentino–Mixto
Bianchi–Peugeot
Bontrager
Brunetta Bike
Coach–Yaco
Funvic
Latinoamericano–Ray
Neuquin
Stemax Sports

National teams

Brazil
Colombia
Cuba
Italy

Stages

Stage 1
11 January 2015 – El Durazno to El Durazno,

Stage 2
12 January 2015 – Villa Mercedes to Villa Mercedes,

Stage 3
13 January 2015 – Merlo to Merlo,

Stage 4
14 January 2015 – El Durazno,  individual time trial (ITT)

Stage 5

Stage 6
16 January 2015 – San Luis to San Luis,

Classification leadership table
In the 2015 Tour Femenino de San Luis, six different jerseys were awarded. For the general classification, calculated by adding each cyclist's finishing times on each stage, and allowing time bonuses at intermediate sprints and for the first three finishers on mass-start stages, the leader received a pink jersey. This classification was considered the most important of the 2015 Tour Femenino de San Luis, and the winner of the classification was considered the winner of the race. Additionally, there was a sprints classification, which awarded a green jersey. In the sprints classification, cyclists received points for finishing in the top 3 at intermediate sprint points during each stage, on a 3–2–1 scale.

There was also a mountains classification, the leadership of which was marked by a red and white polka-dot jersey. In the mountains classification, points were won by reaching the top of a climb before other cyclists. Each climb was categorised as either first, second, or third-category, with more points available for the higher-categorised climbs. For first-category climbs, points were awarded on a scale of 10 points for first across the climb, second place earned 8 points, third 6, fourth 4, fifth 2 and sixth 1. Second-category climbs awarded points on a scale of 6 points for first place, second place earned 4 points, third 2, and fourth 1. Third-category climbs awarded points to the top three riders only; 3 points for first across the climb, second place earned 2 points, third place earned 1 point.

The fourth jersey represented the young rider classification, marked by a yellow jersey. This was decided the same way as the general classification, but only riders born after 1 January 1993 were eligible to be ranked in the classification. There was also classifications for the highest-placed Argentine rider and the highest-placed rider from the San Luis province, with the leaderships marked by a cyan jersey and an orange and white polka-dot jersey respectively.

Lastly, there was a classification for teams, in which the times of the best three cyclists per team on each stage were added together; the leading team at the end of the race was the team with the lowest total time.

See also
2015 in women's road cycling

References

External links

Tour Femenino de San Luis
Cycle races in Argentina
Women's road bicycle races
Tour Femenino de San Luis
Sport in San Luis Province